Shari Koch (born 23 September 1993) is a German former competitive ice dancer. With skating partner Christian Nüchtern, she is the 2014 Bavarian Open silver medalist, 2017 Winter Universiade bronze medalist, and 2019 German national champion.

Career 
Koch started learning to skate in 1999. She and Nüchtern made their international debut at the 2008 NRW Trophy. They placed in the top ten at the 2012 and 2013 World Junior Championships and won the German junior national title three times (2011–13).

Koch/Nüchtern won their first senior international medal, silver, at the 2014 Bavarian Open. After missing the entire 2014–15 season, they returned to international competition in February 2016 at the Bavarian Open. In February 2017, they received the bronze medal at the Winter Universiade in Almaty, Kazakhstan.

Programs 
(with Nüchtern)

Competitive highlights 
GP: Grand Prix; CS: Challenger Series; JGP: Junior Grand Prix

With Nüchtern

References

External links 

 

German female ice dancers
Universiade medalists in figure skating
1993 births
Living people
People from Gummersbach
Sportspeople from Cologne (region)
Universiade bronze medalists for Germany
Competitors at the 2017 Winter Universiade